Ogyrididae is a family of decapod crustaceans consisting of 10 species.

Appearance
Eyes are elongate, reaching nearly to distal end of antennular peduncle. Their first pair of pereiopods is robust and similar in size to the second pair; distinctly chelate. The second pair of pereiopods is divided into four articles. The first maxilliped has an exopod far removed from the endite. But the second maxilliped has segments arranged in usual serial manner; bearing exopod; endopod 4-segmented. Mandible usually with incisor and molar processes and palp. Second maxilla with palp; endite well developed.

Diet
During early years the majority of their diet is composed of sea plankton, sea plants and sea weed. A grown long-eyed shrimp would eat small worms and microscopic organisms. From time to time they might consume dead fish or crabs and occasionally they would turn and eat their own.

Habitat 
This genus contains 11 species distributed along tropical and subtropical coasts around the world. Most of the species in this genome have been found of Australia and Mexico coasts. In this areas the shrimps have the optimal conditions and temperature
to survive. One species Orgrydes mjoebergi has colonised the eastern Mediterranean from the Red Sea via the Suez Canal, a process known as Lessepsian migration.

Behaviour
These long eye-stalked shrimps exhibit complex behaviors like eusociality. Newly molted individuals have displayed a shift of their entire body forwards, with the cephalothorax angled downwards with respect to the pleon and both chelipeds extended forwards and towards each other; body jerked rapidly backwards with pleon curled and walking pereiopods extended; cephalothorax angled upwards, while the chelipeds were spread apart and moved backwards; and continuous undulations of pleopods. Is important to note that this only happened in individuals that were in their burrows and in the presence of light.

Species
All of the species in the family Ogyrididae are classified in a single genus, Ogrydes which was named by the English zoologist Thomas Roscoe Rede Stebbing in 1914. The following species are currently recognised:

 Ogyrides alphaerostris (Kingsley, 1880)
 Ogyrides delli Yaldwyn, 1971
 Ogyrides hayi Williams, 1981
 Ogyrides mjoebergi (Balss, 1921)
 Ogyrides orientalis (Stimpson, 1860)
 Ogyrides rarispina Holthuis, 1951
 Ogyrides saldanhae Barnard, 1947
 Ogyrides sibogae de Man, 1910
 Ogyrides striaticauda Kemp, 1915
 Ogyrides tarazonai Wicksten & Méndez G., 1988
 Ogyrides wickstenae Ayón-Parente & Salgado-Barragán, 2013

References

Alpheoidea
Taxa named by Lipke Holthuis
Decapod families